The National Book Council,  is a Maltese public entity dedicated to the promotion of the book industry in Malta.

It organises the Malta Book Festival, The Literary Contest Of Novels For Youth (Maltese: Konkors ta' Kitba Letteratura għaż-Żgħażagħ) and other national and regional events, workshops, seminars and contests. It also confers the National Book Prize, administers Public Lending Rights, and is Malta's registration agent for ISBN and ISMN.

National Book Prize 
In 1971, the Literary Prize for books in Maltese was set up with the aim to encourage Maltese literature. Notable authors who were awarded this Prize include Anton Buttigieg, Francis Ebejer, Oliver Friggieri, Joe Friggieri, and Trevor Zahra. The organization of the Prize was passed to the National Book Council upon its formation in 2001. There are nowadays several categories within the Prize, including novels, short stories, poetry, translation, nonfiction, and research. Notable winners since 2001 include Trevor Zahra, Guido Lanfranco, Giovanni Bonello, Joe Friggieri, and Albert Ganado.

References

External links 

 

Maltese literature
Cultural organisations based in Malta
Arts organizations established in 2001
2001 establishments in Malta
ISBN agencies